The 1905–06 season was the 11th competitive season in Belgian football.

Overview
It is the first season with a relegation system due to the creation of the second division. Beerschot AC was relegated at the end of the season and replaced by second division qualifier SC Courtraisien.

National team
Belgium won its first official game against France on May 7, 1905.

* Belgium score given first

Key
 H = Home match
 A = Away match
 F = Friendly
 o.g. = own goal

Honours

Final league tables

Division I

Promotion
In the first phase of the championship, 4 provincial leagues were played, with the following qualifiers for the final round:
 For Brabant, Union Saint-Gilloise II (winner) and RC de Bruxelles II (runner-up)
 For East Flanders and Antwerp, RC de Gand
 For West Flanders, SC Courtraisien
 For Liège, Standard FC Liégeois

External links
Belgian clubs history

References